Research Organization Registry (ROR) is a community-led database that aims to provide a persistent identifier for every research organization in the world. It complements other commonly used identifiers such as ORCID for researchers and DOI for research output.

Initially the database was seeded by the data from Global Research Identifier Database (GRID). In 2021 it was announced that ROR will take over the role of the leading open organization identifier from GRID. ROR's first release after separating from GRID was published in March 2022.

The database can be accessed via the official website, an open API or as a downloadable data dump. All ROR IDs and metadata are provided under the CC0 license.

References

External links 

 Official website

Identifiers
Open data
Creative Commons-licensed databases
Metadata
Semantic Web
Library cataloging and classification
Research organizations